Jennifer Ahern (born 1974) is an American epidemiologist. She currently holds the King Sweesy and Robert Womack Endowed Chair and is Associate Dean for Research at the UC Berkeley School of Public Health. Her research focuses on the effects of the social and physical environment, and programs and policies that alter the social and physical environment, on many aspects of health including violence, substance abuse, mental health, and perinatal health.

Ahern earned a Bachelor of Arts in human biology from Brown University in 1997. She completed her Master of Public Health and doctoral degree in epidemiology at the University of California, Berkeley in 2000 and 2007, respectively.

In 2021-2022, she was President of the Society for Epidemiologic Research. In 2022, she was named a Chan Zuckerberg Biohub Investigator.

References 

Brown University alumni
UC Berkeley School of Public Health alumni
UC Berkeley School of Public Health faculty
1974 births
Living people